Kaneka may refer to:

 , a musical genre developed by the Kanak people of New Caledonia
 Kaneka Corporation, a Japanese chemical company